Nicolas Kim Coppola (born January 7, 1964), better known by his stage name Nicolas Cage, is an American actor and film producer. Born into the Coppola family, he is the recipient of various accolades, including an Academy Award, a Screen Actors Guild Award, and a Golden Globe Award.

In the first few years of his career, he starred in a variety of films such as Valley Girl (1983), Peggy Sue Got Married (1986), Raising Arizona (1987), Moonstruck (1987), Wild at Heart (1990), and It Could Happen to You (1994). During this period, John Willis' Screen World, Vol. 36 listed him as one of 12 Promising New Actors of 1984. For his performance in Leaving Las Vegas (1995), he won the Academy Award for Best Actor. He received his second Academy Award nomination for his performance as Charlie and Donald Kaufman in Adaptation (2002).

He subsequently appeared in more mainstream films, including The Rock (1996), Con Air (1997), Face/Off (1997), City of Angels (1998), Bringing Out the Dead (1999), Gone in 60 Seconds (2000), The Family Man (2000), Windtalkers (2002), Matchstick Men (2003), the National Treasure film series (2004–2007), Lord of War (2005), The Wicker Man (2006), Ghost Rider (2007), Knowing (2009), and Bad Lieutenant: Port of Call New Orleans (2009). Between the 2010s and the 2020s, he starred in films such as Kick-Ass (2010), Joe (2013), Mandy (2018), Spider-Man: Into the Spider-Verse (2018), Pig (2021), and The Unbearable Weight of Massive Talent (2022), roles that increased his popularity and solidified his cult following.

Cage owns the production company Saturn Films and has produced films such as Shadow of the Vampire (2000) and The Life of David Gale (2003). He also directed Sonny (2002), for which he was nominated for Grand Special Prize at Deauville Film Festival. He was ranked No. 40 in Empire magazine's The Top 100 Movie Stars of All Time list in 2007 and was placed No. 37 in Premieres 100 Most Powerful People in Hollywood in 2008.

Early life and family
Cage was born in Long Beach, California, to August Coppola, a professor of literature, and Joy Vogelsang, a dancer and choreographer. He was raised in a Catholic family. His father was of Italian descent and his mother was of German and Polish ancestry. His paternal grandparents were composer Carmine Coppola and actress Italia Pennino, and his paternal great-grandparents were immigrants from Bernalda, Basilicata. Through his father, he is a nephew of director Francis Ford Coppola and of actress Talia Shire, and a cousin of directors Roman Coppola and Sofia Coppola, film producer Gian-Carlo Coppola, and actors Robert and Jason Schwartzman.

Cage's two brothers are New York radio personality Marc "The Cope" Coppola and director Christopher Coppola. He attended Beverly Hills High School, which is known for its many alumni who became entertainers. He aspired to act from an early age and also attended UCLA School of Theater, Film and Television. His first non-cinematic acting experience was in a school production of Golden Boy. He said he started acting because he "wanted to be James Dean. I saw him in Rebel Without a Cause, East of Eden. Nothing affected me—no rock song, no classical music—the way Dean affected me in Eden. It blew my mind. I was like, 'That's what I want to do'."

At age 15, he tried to convince his uncle, Francis Ford Coppola, to give him a screen test, telling him "I'll show you acting." His outburst was met with "silence in the car". By this stage of his career, Coppola had already directed Marlon Brando, Al Pacino, Gene Hackman and Robert De Niro. Although early in his career Cage appeared in some of his uncle's films, he changed his name to Nicolas Cage to avoid the appearance of nepotism as Coppola's nephew. His choice of name was inspired by the Marvel Comics superhero Luke Cage and composer John Cage.

Career

1981–1988: Early work and breakthrough
Cage made his acting debut in the 1981 television pilot The Best of Times, which was never picked up by ABC. His film debut followed in 1982, with a minor role as an unnamed co-worker of Judge Reinhold's character in the coming-of-age film Fast Times at Ridgemont High, having originally auditioned for Reinhold's part. His experience on the film was marred by cast members endlessly quoting his uncle's films, which inspired him to change his name. Cage's first starring role came opposite Deborah Foreman in the romantic comedy Valley Girl (1983), in which he played a punk who falls in love with the titular valley girl, a plot loosely inspired by Romeo and Juliet. The film was a modest box office success and has been branded a cult classic. He auditioned for the role of Dallas Winston in his uncle's film The Outsiders, based on S.E. Hinton's novel, but lost to Matt Dillon. Cage, however, would co-star in Coppola's adaptation of another Hinton novel, Rumble Fish, in that year.

In 1984, Cage appeared in three period films, none of which fared well at the box office. In the drama, Racing with the Moon (1984), Cage featured opposite Sean Penn as friends who are awaiting deployment to the U.S. Marine Corps. Coppola's crime drama The Cotton Club saw him play a fictionalized version of mob hitman Vincent "Mad Dog" Coll, earning praise from critic Paul Attanasio for "artully [using] his few moments to sketch a brawny, violent thug". His final release of the year was Alan Parker's drama Birdy, in which he starred with Matthew Modine as two close friends and their trauma inflicted by serving in the Vietnam War. Cage lost weight for the role and had two of his front teeth pulled out to appear disfigured. Despite massively underperforming at the box office, the film, and Cage and Modine's performances, received positive reviews, with The New York Times critic Janet Maslin writing, "Mr. Cage very sympathetically captures Al's urgency and frustration. Together, these actors work miracles with what might have been unplayable."

In 1986, Cage starred in the little-seen Canadian sports drama The Boy in Blue and his uncle's fantasy comedy Peggy Sue Got Married (1987) as the husband to Kathleen Turner's character, who has travelled back in time to their high school days. He then starred in the Coen brothers' crime comedy Raising Arizona (1987) as a dim-witted ex-con. Cage's biggest breakthrough came in 1987 with the romantic comedy Moonstruck, in which he starred alongside Cher as a hot-tempered baker who falls in love with his estranged brother's widowed fiancé. The film was a hit with critics and audiences alike, earning Cage a Golden Globe nomination for Best Actor – Motion Picture Musical or Comedy
 In his retrospective review, Roger Ebert wrote that he felt Cage's performance was worthy of an Oscar.

1989–1994: Career slump
In 1989, Cage starred in the black comedy Vampire's Kiss as a man who falls in love with a vampire and soon begins to believe he himself is a vampire. The film was a major box office flop, but has developed a cult following largely due to Cage's surrealistic and over-the-top performance appearing in internet memes. Critic Vincent Canby felt the film was "dominated and destroyed by Mr. Cage's chaotic, self-indulgent performance". After filming the Italian drama Time to Kill (1989) in Zimbabwe, he starred in David Lynch's romantic crime film Wild at Heart (1990) with Laura Dern as a pair of lovers on the run from gangsters hired to kill Cage's character "Sailor" Ripley. Cage was drawn to the project because he was "always attracted to those passionate, almost unbridled romantic characters" and it allowed him to impersonate one of his heroes, Elvis Presley, in scenes in which Sailor sings. Wild at Heart received mixed reviews upon release, despite controversially winning the Palme d'Or at 1990 Cannes Film Festival. Cage would reunite with Lynch and Dern for the avant-garde concert performance Industrial Symphony No. 1.

Also in 1990, he starred as a helicopter pilot in the action film Fire Birds, which was panned by critics and negatively compared to Top Gun (1986). Cage's next film, the erotic thriller Zandalee (1991), was released direct-to-video in the United States, where it did not receive a theatrical release. His "goofy 'everyman'" performance in the romantic comedy Honeymoon in Vegas (1992) garnered some positive critical notices, including from Roger Ebert, who defended Cage amidst some critics finding his acting "excessive" and earned Cage his second Gloden Globe nomination. He hosted an episode of the variety show Saturday Night Live to promote the film, his only time hosting the show. None of Cage's three films in 1993—Deadfall (directed by his brother Christopher), Amos & Andrew and Red Rock West—performed well at the box office; though the last-mentioned neo-noir thriller in which he played a drifter mistaken for a hitman was lauded by critics. The comedy Guarding Tess (1994) paired Cage with Shirley MacLaine as a Secret Service agent protecting a former First Lady; however, it was dismissed as being derivative by some critics. He next starred alongside Bridget Fonda in the romantic comedy It Could Happen to You as a cash-strapped police officer who offers to share his lottery winnings with a waitress and then the much-criticized box office flop Christmas comedy Trapped in Paradise with the Saturday Night Live actors Jon Lovitz and Dana Carvey. According to Lovitz, Cage directed portions of the film because its director, George Gallo, offered little direction.

1995–2003: Critical success and action star
Cage's performance as a psychopathic criminal kingpin in the crime film Kiss of Death (1995) was seen by many critics as the film strongpoint, but his most acclaimed performance yet came in the drama Leaving Las Vegas as an alcoholic screenwriter who falls in love with a prostitute in Las Vegas. The role won Cage the Academy Award for Best Actor and Golden Globe Award for Best Actor – Motion Picture Drama.  In 2002 he was again nominated for Oscar and Golden Globe best actor awards for his portrayal of real-life screenwriter Charlie Kaufman and Kaufman's fictional twin Donald in Adaptation. 

Other films included Martin Scorsese's 1999 New York City paramedic drama Bringing Out the Dead and Ridley Scott's 2003 black comedy crime film Matchstick Men, in which he played a con artist with obsessive–compulsive disorder. Most of Cage's movies that have achieved financial success were in the action/adventure genre. These include The Rock, in which Cage plays a young FBI chemical weapons expert who infiltrates Alcatraz Island in the hope of neutralizing a terrorist threat, Con Air, a film where he plays a former army ranger who has to stop hijackers on an airplane, Face/Off, a John Woo film where he plays both a hero and a villain, Gone in 60 Seconds, with Cage as a retired car thief, and World Trade Center, director Oliver Stone's film about the September 11 attacks. The suspense thriller 8mm (1999) is considered a cult film. 

He took the lead role in the 2001 film Captain Corelli's Mandolin and learned to play the mandolin from scratch for the part. He made his directorial debut with 2002's Sonny.

2004–2011: Franchise films

In his second-highest-grossing film to date, National Treasure, he plays an eccentric historian who goes on a dangerous adventure to find treasure hidden by the Founding Fathers of the United States. In 2005, two films he headlined, Lord of War and The Weather Man, failed to find a significant audience despite nationwide releases and good reviews for his performances. The 2006 remake of The Wicker Man was very poorly reviewed, and failed to make back its $40 million budget.  The much-criticized Ghost Rider (2007), based on the Marvel Comics character, fared better, earning more than $45 million (the top earner) during its opening weekend and over $208 million worldwide through the weekend ending on March 25, 2007. Also in 2007, he had a small but notable role as the Chinese criminal mastermind Dr. Fu Manchu in Rob Zombie's fake trailer Werewolf Women of the S.S. from the B-movie double feature Grindhouse and starred in Next, which shared the concept of a glimpse into an alternate timeline with Cage's film, The Family Man (2000).

In November 2007, Cage was spotted backstage at a Ring of Honor wrestling show in New York City researching for the lead role for The Wrestler. However, Cage dropped out of production shortly afterward because he felt that he did not have enough time to prepare for the role and director Darren Aronofsky preferred Mickey Rourke for the lead role. Rourke would go on to receive an Academy Award nomination for his performance. In an interview with /Film, Aronofsky said of Cage's decision to leave the film that "Nic was a complete gentleman, and he understood that my heart was with Mickey and he stepped aside. I have so much respect for Nic Cage as an actor and I think it really could have worked with Nic but ... you know, Nic was incredibly supportive of Mickey and he is old friends with Mickey and really wanted to help with this opportunity, so he pulled himself out of the race."

In 2008, Cage appeared as Joe, a contract killer who undergoes a change of heart while on a work outing in Bangkok, in the film Bangkok Dangerous. The film is shot by the Pang Brothers and has a distinctly South-East Asian flavor. In 2009, Cage starred in the science fiction thriller Knowing, directed by Alex Proyas. In the film, he plays an MIT professor who examines the contents of a time capsule unearthed at his son's elementary school. Startling predictions found inside the capsule that has already come true lead him to believe that the world is going to end at the close of the week and that he and his son are somehow involved in the destruction. The film received mainly negative reviews but was the box office winner on its opening weekend.

Also in 2009, Cage starred in the film Bad Lieutenant: Port of Call New Orleans, directed by acclaimed German director Werner Herzog. He portrayed a corrupt police officer with gambling, drug and alcohol addictions. The film was very well received by critics, holding a rating of 87% positive reviews on review aggregator website Rotten Tomatoes. Cage was lauded for his performance, with Michael Phillips of the Chicago Tribune writing "Herzog has found his ideal interpreter, a performer whose truth lies deep in the artifice of performance: ladies and gentlemen, Nicolas Cage, at his finest." This film reunited Cage with Eva Mendes, who played his love interest in Ghost Rider. In 2010, Cage starred in The Sorcerer's Apprentice, in which he played the sorcerer, and the next year, headlined the period piece Season of the Witch, as a 14th-century knight transporting a woman accused of causing the Black Plague to a monastery. In 2011, Cage reprised his role in Ghost Rider's sequel Ghost Rider: Spirit of Vengeance.

2012–2019: Prolificity and direct-to-video films

He voiced the character Grug Crood in the animated film The Croods, which was released in 2013. The Croods received positive reviews from critics and was a box office success grossing $585 million against a budget of $135 million. In the same year he starred as main character in The Frozen Ground, a thriller crime drama film directed and written by Scott Walker in his directorial debut, based on the crimes of real-life Alaskan serial killer Robert Hansen: The film depicts an Alaskan State Trooper, played by Cage, seeking to apprehend Hansen by partnering with a young woman, who escaped from Hansen's clutches. The film has received mixed reviews though Cage's performance was cited as a highlight and solid.

In 2013 he also starred in Joe, an independent crime drama film directed and co-produced by David Gordon Green, adaptation from Larry Brown's 1991 novel of the same name. In this film Nicolas Cage is a tormented man who hires a 15-year-old boy (played by Tye Sheridan) and protects him from his abusive father. The film premiered at the 70th Venice International Film Festival on August 30, 2013, with a subsequent screening at the 2013 Toronto International Film Festival. It was a box office flop, grossing only $2.36 million from a $4 million budget, but received critical acclaim from critics, who praised Cage's performance and Green's direction.

The 2016 black comedy Dog Eat Dog, Cage's second film with Paul Schrader, reunited him with Willem Dafoe (after Wild at Heart) as a pair of ex-convicts hired to kidnap a baby. The film had its premiere as the closing entry for the Directors' Fortnight section at the 2016 Cannes Film Festival on May 20, 2016. It was released on November 4, 2016, in the United States. Peter Bradshaw of The Guardian gave the film 4 out of 5 stars, writing, "It's the right director for the right project and the result is Schrader's best for years: a lairy, nasty, tasty crime thriller built on black-comic chaos." Todd McCarthy of The Hollywood Reporter wrote, "A rare film to have been shot in Cleveland, Dog Eat Dog definitely looks like it was shot on the cheap but puts what it needs to up on the screen with vigor and wit."

Cage starred alongside Selma Blair and Anne Winters in Brian Taylor's horror comedy film, Mom and Dad, which premiered in the Midnight Madness section at the 2017 Toronto International Film Festival. It was released in theaters on January 19, 2018, and received positive reviews from critics, with review aggregator Rotten Tomatoes defining his performance as "over-the-top." Director John Waters appreciated the film, naming Mom and Dad as one of the best movies of 2018, placing it fourth on his personal top list.

In 2018, Cage starred in the action thriller film Mandy, which premiered on January 19 at the 2018 Sundance Film Festival. Nick Allen of RogerEbert.com praised the movie, writing that "for all of the endless feral performances that Cage has given, in movies good, bad and forgettable, Cosmatos' style-driven, '80s-tastic passion for weird worlds and characters takes full advantage of Cage's greatness, and then some." In October, Mandy's producer Elijah Wood announced the intention to sizing up an Oscar campaign for Nicolas Cage and for composer Jóhann Jóhannsson (who died in February of that year) but the film was disqualified because it was also released on VOD on September 14.

Later that year, Cage voiced Superman in the animated film Teen Titans Go! To the Movies. He had originally been slated to portray Superman in Tim Burton's canceled Superman film, Superman Lives, in the 1990s. He voiced an alternate monochromatic 1930s universe version of Peter Parker / Spider-Man Noir in Spider-Man: Into the Spider-Verse (2018). Cage based his vocal performance on films of Humphrey Bogart, James Cagney, and Edward G. Robinson.

On January 28, 2019, Viktor and Irina Yelchin premiered a documentary about their son Anton Yelchin, Love, Antosha, at the 2019 Sundance Film Festival. The documentary was directed by Garret Price and contains various interviews with some of Anton's friends and collaborators like Kristen Stewart, J. J. Abrams, Chris Pine, Jennifer Lawrence, Jodie Foster, John Cho and Martin Landau. Cage starred as the Narrator of the film, reading various Anton's writings.

In December 2018, it was announced that Cage had signed to play the lead role for Richard Stanley's Color Out of Space, based on the short story "The Colour Out of Space" by H. P. Lovecraft. This was Stanley's first feature film directed since his firing from The Island of Dr. Moreau (1996). Color Out of Space premiered on September 7, 2019, in the Midnight Madness portion of the 2019 Toronto International Film Festival, where Cage was awarded for his role with the Creative Coalition's Spotlight Initiative Award. Following select preview screenings on January 22, the film was released in 81 theaters in the United States on January 24, 2020.

In December 2018, it was announced that Sion Sono was working on his first overseas production and English-language debut, Prisoners of the Ghostland, starring Nicolas Cage. Cage defined the film "might be the wildest movie I've ever made." Its plot revolves around a notorious criminal, Hero (played by Cage), who is sent to rescue the governor's adopted granddaughter, who has disappeared into a dark region called Ghostland. The film had its world premiere at the 2021 Sundance Film Festival on January 31, 2021.

2020–present: Career resurgence
In May 2020 it was announced that Cage would be playing the role of Joe Exotic in a scripted eight-episode Tiger King series, written and executive produced by Dan Lagana. It was announced that the project was scrapped in July 2021.

In April 2013, DreamWorks Animation announced a sequel to the film The Croods. In September 2013, it was confirmed that Nicolas Cage would reprise his role in the sequel as Grug from the first film. The Croods: A New Age, directed by Joel Crawford, was released theatrically in the United States on November 25, 2020.

Cage produced and starred in the 2021 film Pig, and received critical acclaim for his performance. He gained further acclaim for portraying a fictionalized version of himself in the 2022 action comedy film The Unbearable Weight of Massive Talent.

In November 2021, Cage was cast in the Universal Classic Monsters spin-off film, Renfield. Cage will feature in a supporting role, to Nicholas Hoult's titular R.M. Renfield, as Dracula. The film will be directed by Chris McKay, with a script by Ryan Ridley, from an original story by Robert Kirkman. McKay and Kirkman will also produce the feature film alongside David Alpert, Bryan Furst and Sean Furst. The project will be a joint-venture production between Skybound Entertainment, and Universal Pictures. Principal photography began in early 2022.

Producing and directing
Cage made his directorial debut in 2002 with Sonny, a low-budget drama starring James Franco as a male prostitute whose mother (Brenda Blethyn) serves as his pimp. Cage had a small role in the film, which received poor reviews and a short run in a limited number of theaters. Cage's producing career includes Shadow of the Vampire, the first effort from Saturn Films.

In early December 2006, Cage announced at the Bahamas International Film Festival that he planned to curtail his future acting endeavors to pursue other interests. On The Dresden Files for the Sci-Fi Channel, Cage is listed as the executive producer.

Other work
Cage, an avid comic book fan, auctioned a collection of 400 vintage comics through Heritage Auctions for over $1.6 million in 2002. In 2007, he created a comic book with his son Weston, called Voodoo Child, which was published by Virgin Comics.
Cage is a fan and collector of painter and underground comic artist Robert Williams. He has written introductions for Juxtapoz magazine and purchased the painting Death on the Boards.

Reception and acting style

In February 2011, Cage said that, at a certain point in his career, he realized that he had developed his own method of acting, which he described as "Nouveau Shamanic." He noted, "at some point I'll have to write a book" about it. Cage later explained that he drew the inspiration for the name from the book The Way of the Actor by Brian Bates, in which he read about the parallel between the ancient shamans and thespians. In other interviews, Cage defined his acting style using terms such as German Expressionism or "Western kabuki".

On some occasions, Cage stood up for his extreme method acting. For Birdy, in order to physically feel the pain of his character (a veteran from Vietnam War), Cage removed two teeth, which would have had to be pulled anyway, without any anesthesia. He also spent five weeks with his face wrapped in bandages, receiving brutal reactions by various people for his aspect. When he took the bandages off, his skin was infected because of acne and ingrowing hairs.

Vampire's Kiss''' casting director Marcia Shulman declared that Cage asked to have hot yogurt poured over his toes to get excited during a love scene with Jennifer Beals. He also studied Brazilian jiu-jitsu under the UFC champion Royce Gracie, for his roles in action films. During an interview of 2013 for promoting Joe, Cage revealed that he followed a diet based on red meat and steaks to gain weight for the role and to identify himself as a carnivore.

According to The Guardian film critic Luke Buckmaster, "any casual observer can see that Cage is entertaining, charismatic and wildly flamboyant". Attributing it partly to the "well-cultured" background of Cage's family, Buckmaster said the actor "is clearly attracted to grotesque characters and is celebrated for his wild and unhinged approach to them. He has the presence of a leading man, and the eccentricities of a character actor." Actor Ethan Hawke stated in 2013 that Cage is "the only actor since Marlon Brando that's actually done anything new with the art", crediting him for taking film audiences "away from an obsession with naturalism into a kind of presentation style of acting that I imagine was popular with the old troubadours."

Film director David Lynch described him as "the jazz musician of American acting". Many critics have accused Cage of overacting. Others, including Cage himself, have described his intentionally extreme performances as "mega-acting". After the actor's series of mainstream-marketed thriller films during the late 1990s, Sean Penn told The New York Times in 1999 that Cage was "no longer an actor" but "more like a performer". Despite this, in his speech after winning the Oscar for his performance in Mystic River, Penn described Cage's work (in Matchstick Men) as one of the best performances of 2003.

During the 2010s, a growing number of film critics described Cage as one of the most underrated actors of his generation.

In July 2021, Cage told Variety that the commercial constraints that were imposed on his performances was the main reason he abandoned Hollywood and that he opted to work for low-budget independent films because it gave him more freedom to experiment and be fluid.

Personal life
Relationships and family
In 1988, Cage began dating actress Christina Fulton, with whom he has a son, Weston Coppola Cage (born December 26, 1990). Weston has been involved in two black metal bands, and appeared in his father's film Lord of War as a helicopter mechanic. Through Weston, Cage has two grandsons born in 2014 and 2016.

Cage has been married five times. His first wife was actress Patricia Arquette, whom he married in April 1995 and divorced in 2001.

Cage's second marriage was to singer-songwriter Lisa Marie Presley, daughter of Elvis and Priscilla Presley. (Cage, an Elvis fan, used Elvis as the inspiration for his performance in Wild at Heart.) They married in Kamuela, Hawaii on August 10, 2002, and filed for divorce 107 days later on November 25, 2002. The divorce was finalized on May 24, 2004.

Cage's third wife was Alice Kim. They were married at a private ranch in northern California on July 30, 2004. She gave birth to their son Kal-El (after Superman's birth name) on October 3, 2005. They divorced in January 2016.

In March 2019, Cage married Erika Koike in Las Vegas, only to file for annulment four days later. He was granted a divorce from Koike three months later.

On February 16, 2021, Cage married Riko Shibata. Their daughter, August Francesca, was born on September 7, 2022.

Political and religious views
Cage grew up in a family of Catholic background, but does not talk about religion publicly and refuses to answer religion-connected questions in his interviews. When asked about the film Knowing being a religion-themed film or not, Cage replied, "Any of my personal beliefs or opinions runs the risk of impinging on your own relationship with the movie. I feel movies are best left enigmatic, left raising more questions than answers. I don't want to ever preach. So [whatever you get] from the movie [is] far more interesting than [anything] I could ever offer."

During his visit to University of California, Santa Cruz he stated that he is not a politically active actor and that he can do it in his work as he learned "more about nuclear power from the movie The China Syndrome". Cage endorsed Andrew Yang for president during the 2020 election.

At one point in his life, Cage had decided that he wanted to develop the philosophical aspect of his nature, and he went on a quest to find the Holy Grail. Cage traveled to England to look for it, but also looked at some areas of the United States.

Charitable activities
Cage has been called one of the most generous stars in Hollywood. He donated $2 million to Amnesty International for them to use to offer rehabilitation shelters, medical services and psychological and reintegration services to some of the 300,000 children forced to fight in conflicts across the world. He has also donated $1 million to the victims of Hurricane Katrina. He became the first artist to support ArtWorks, an artist engagement program to raise awareness of fundamental rights at work, including freedom from slavery and from child labor.

Cage has also been honored with a Humanitarian award from United Nations for his works and appointed as a UN ambassador for Global Justice in 2009 and again in 2013. He led a campaign around the film Lord of War to raise awareness about international arms control, supported "Heal the Bay," the United Negro College Fund efforts, and the Royal United Hospital's Forever Friends Appeal to build intensive care units for babies.

Real estate and tax problems

Nicolas Cage was once considered one of Hollywood's highest-paid actors, earning $40 million in 2009 according to Forbes, although he failed to make Forbes' Top 10 List in 2014. Cage had a Malibu home where he and Kim lived, but sold the property in 2005 for $10 million. In 2004 he bought a property on Paradise Island, Bahamas. He bought the medieval castle Schloss Neidstein in the Oberpfalz region in Germany in 2006 and sold it in 2009 for $2.5 million. His grandmother was German, living in Cochem an der Mosel.

In August 2007, Cage purchased "Grey Craig," a  brick-and-stone country manor in Middletown, Rhode Island. With an estate occupying , the home has 12 bedrooms and 10 full bathrooms and overlooks the Atlantic Ocean. It borders the Norman Bird Sanctuary to the west. The sale ranked among the state of Rhode Island's most expensive residential purchases. Also in 2007, Cage purchased Midford Castle in Somerset, England. Shortly after selling his German castle, Cage also put his homes in Rhode Island, Louisiana, Nevada, and California, as well as a $7 million island in the Bahamas, on the market.

On July 14, 2009, the Internal Revenue Service filed documents in New Orleans in connection with a federal tax lien against property owned by Cage in Louisiana, concerning unpaid federal taxes. The IRS alleged that Cage failed to pay over $6.2 million in federal income tax for the year 2007. In addition, the Internal Revenue Service had another lien for more than $350,000 in unpaid taxes dating from 2002 to 2004. Cage filed a $20 million lawsuit on October 16, 2009, against his business manager, Samuel J. Levin, alleging negligence and fraud. The lawsuit stated that Levin "had failed to pay taxes when they were due and had placed [Cage] in speculative and risky real estate investments 'resulting in (the actor) suffering catastrophic losses. Cage also faced separate lawsuits from East West Bank and Red Curb Investments for unpaid, multi-million dollar loans.

Samuel Levin filed a counter-complaint and responded to the lawsuit in a filing stating that he warned Cage that he was living beyond his means and urged him to spend less. Levin's filing states that "instead of listening to Levin, cross-defendant Cage (Coppola) spent most of his free time shopping for high ticket purchases, and wound up with 15 personal residences." Levin's complaint continued: "Likewise, Levin advised Coppola against buying a Gulfstream jet, against buying and owning a flotilla of yachts, against buying and owning a squadron of Rolls Royces, against buying millions of dollars in jewelry and art."

In his filing, Levin said that in 2007, Cage's "shopping spree entailed the purchase of three additional residences at a total cost of more than $33 million; the purchase of 22 automobiles (including 9 Rolls Royces), 12 purchases of expensive jewelry, and 47 purchases of artwork and exotic items." One of those items was a dinosaur skull of a Tarbosaurus. After discovering that it was stolen, he returned it to the Mongolian authorities.

According to Cage, he owned the "Most Haunted House in America," a home located in the French Quarter of New Orleans, Louisiana. Known as "The LaLaurie House" after its former owner Delphine LaLaurie, the house was foreclosed and sold at auction on November 12, 2009, along with another New Orleans property for a total of $5.5 million, in the wake of Cage's financial problems. His Bel Air home, which had six loans totaling $18 million on it, failed to sell at an April 2010 foreclosure auction despite an opening offer of $10.4 million, substantially less than the $35 million that Cage had originally tried to sell it for. The home, built in 1940 for $110,000, had been owned at different times by Dean Martin and singer Tom Jones.

The home eventually sold in November 2010 for $10.5 million. Another home in Nevada also faced foreclosure auction. In November 2011, Cage sold his Action Comics #1 in an online auction managed by Heritage Auctions for a record-breaking $2.16 million (the previous record being $1.5 million), to assist paying his tax liens and other debts. Cage purchased the comic in 1997 for $110,000. The comic had been stolen from him in 2000, and Cage had received an insurance payment on the item. In March 2011, it was found in a storage locker in the San Fernando Valley and was verified by ComicConnect.com to be the copy sold to Cage previously. Worth around $25 million by May 2017, Cage was reportedly "taking [film] roles left and right" in order to pay off his remaining debts. By 2022, Cage confirmed that he had finally paid off his debts and intended to be more selective with his film roles.

Legal issues
Kathleen Turner wrote in her 2008 memoir, Send Your Roses, that Cage had stolen a chihuahua and was arrested twice for driving drunk while they filmed Peggy Sue Got Married. Later she admitted Cage did not steal a chihuahua and she was sorry. Cage won a libel action against Turner, her publisher Headline Publishing Group and Associated Newspapers (whose publication the Daily Mail had repeated the allegations when they published an excerpt from the book). Christina Fulton sued Cage in December 2009 for $13 million and for the house in which she was living. The suit was in response to an order that she leave the dwelling; the order resulted from Cage's financial difficulties. The case was settled in June 2011.

Cage was arrested in New Orleans' French Quarter district on April 15, 2011, for suspicion of domestic abuse battery, disturbing the peace and public intoxication. A police officer was flagged down by onlookers after Cage allegedly grabbed his wife's upper arm while appearing to be under the influence of alcohol. Cage was held in police custody until a bail of $11,000 was posted by Duane "Dog" Chapman. He was later ordered to appear in court on May 31, 2011. The New Orleans District Attorney announced that the charges against Cage had been dropped on May 5, 2011.

Honors and nominations

For his contributions to the film industry, Cage was inducted into the Hollywood Walk of Fame in 1998 with a motion pictures star located at 7021 Hollywood Boulevard. In May 2001, Cage was awarded an Honorary Doctorate in Fine Arts by California State University, Fullerton. He spoke at the commencement ceremony. Cage has also been nominated for an Academy Award twice. He won an Academy Award for Best Actor for his role in the film Leaving Las Vegas in 1995. He was nominated for a second one for his role in the film Adaptation in 2002.

He also won a Golden Globe award, Screen Actors Guild award and many more awards for Leaving Las Vegas. He has received nominations by the Golden Globe, Screen Actors Guild and BAFTA for his films Adaptation, Honeymoon in Vegas and Moonstruck.'' He has also won and been nominated for many other awards.

See also

 Coppola family tree
 List of oldest and youngest Academy Award winners and nominees

References

External links

 
 
 

1964 births
Living people
20th-century American male actors
21st-century American male actors
American film producers
American male film actors
American male voice actors
American people of German descent
American people of Italian descent
American people of Polish descent
Arquette family
Best Actor Academy Award winners
Best Drama Actor Golden Globe (film) winners
Beverly Hills High School alumni
Coppola family
Film directors from Los Angeles
Male actors from Las Vegas
Male actors from Long Beach, California
Method actors
Presley family
American Christians
Christians from California
Outstanding Performance by a Male Actor in a Leading Role Screen Actors Guild Award winners